Guldborgsund is the strait between the Danish islands of Lolland and Falster. It connects Smålandsfarvandet in the north with the Bay of Mecklenburg in the south. The strait is about 30 kilometers long; its breadth varies from 150 meters at Guldborg to 6 kilometer south of Nykøbing Falster. It is navigable for craft of up to 6 metres draught in its northern part and is used for commercial traffic to Nykøbing Falster. The southern part is much shallower with a minimum depth of approximately 2 metres, and can only be used by yachts and other small craft.

Guldborgsund is crossed by two bascule bridges, Frederick IX Bridge at Nykøbing and Guldborgsund Bridge at Guldborg, at the northern end of the strait. There is also a modern tunnel carrying euro route E47 from Copenhagen.

Nykøbing Falster, Guldborg and Sundby have all have marinas in Guldborgsund. Furthermore, the open-air museum Middle Ages Centre has got a museum harbour which was dug out in the mid 1990s. This is the starting point for sailing with reconstructed medieval ships such as Gedesbyskibet.

Guldborgsund was the location of the 2005 KFUM-Spejderne i Danmark National Jamboree.

Battleship
Guldborgsund is also the name of a minesweeper that served in the Royal Danish Navy from 1956 to 1993. It was built by Stephens Brothers Inc. in Stockton, United States, and launched March 14, 1956. It was crewed by 33-37 men, including four officers, during its service. It was decommissioned on May 4, 1993.

Gallery

References

Straits of Denmark
Straits of the Baltic Sea
Lolland
Falster
Ramsar sites in Denmark